Pylypets is a village located in Khust Raion of Zakarpattia Oblast in Ukraine.

History 

Pylypets was first mentioned in Hungarian written sources in 1463 under the name of Verelepets, which was founded by fugitive settlers from lower-lying villages who wanted to escape persecution by their feudal lords. According to legend, the current name of the village derives from a shepherd named Philip, who first settled here.

Before 1919, the village was located in the Lands of the Crown of Saint Stephen of the Austro-Hungarian Empire. During World War I, in October 1914, the village was briefly occupied by the Imperial Russian Army. After the war, it was briefly part of the Hungarian Soviet Republic. At the beginning of April 1919, a Soviet Council was elected in Pylynka, which, however, only existed until the village was taken by Romanian troops during the Hungarian–Romanian War at the end of the month. After the Paris Peace Conference, the village was annexed by Czechoslovakia as part of Subcarpathian Ruthenia. On 15 March 1939, the village was occupied by Hungarian troops and annexed by Hungary until it was captured by troops of the 4th Ukrainian Front of the Red Army on 11 October 1944. After World War II, the local area became part of the Ukrainian Soviet Socialist Republic in 1946 within the Soviet Union. After its dissolution, Pylypets became part of independent Ukraine in 1991.

Until 18 July 2020, Pylypets belonged to Mizhhiria Raion. The raion was abolished in July 2020 as part of the administrative reform of Ukraine, which reduced the number of raions of Zakarpattia Oblast to six. The area of Mizhhiria Raion was merged into Khust Raion.

Demographics
Native language as of the Ukrainian Census of 2001:
 Ukrainian 99.64%
 Russian 0.36%

Tourism

During the Summer months, the village is a starting point for hiking tourists and a paragliding center.

The eighteenth-century wooden Church of the Nativity of the Blessed Virgin Mary is an architectural monument.

References

Villages in Khust Raion